Before the Ever After is a middle-grade novel in verse by Jacqueline Woodson, published September 1, 2020 by Nancy Paulsen Books.

Reception 
Before the Ever After received starred reviews from Kirkus, Booklist, School Library Journal, Horn Book, Publishers Weekly, and Shelf Awareness, as well as a positive review from The Bulletin of the Center for Children's Books.

Kirkus named it one of the best books of the year.

The audiobook received a starred review from Booklist.

References 

2020 children's books
Coretta Scott King Award-winning works
NAACP Image Awards
Literature by African-American women